Lorenzo Strozzi (December 3, 1513 – December 14, 1571) was an Italian abbot and cardinal. He was the son of Filippo Strozzi, a member of the powerful Strozzi family of Florence, and Clarice de' Medici.

Lorenzo Strozzi was born in Florence. His ecclesiastical career developed in France, first as abbot of Saint-Victor in Marseille (which he renounced in 1561), later as abbot of Villar San Costanzo at Staffarda, and then as bishop of Béziers in 1548. He fought firmly the spread of Calvinism in Languedoc, supported by the French queen Catherine de' Medici, who had grown up with Lorenzo after her father's death.

He was created cardinal by Pope Paul IV in the consistory of March 15, 1557, with the title of Santa Balbina.

Later he was archbishop of Albi (1561), archbishop of Aix-en-Provence (1568-1571) and archbishop of Siena from 1568.

He died at Avignon in 1571.

Ancestry

References

External links
Biography

1513 births
1571 deaths
Nobility from Florence
Lorenzo
16th-century Italian cardinals
Archbishops of Aix
Bishops of Albi
Bishops of Béziers
Clergy from Florence
16th-century Italian Roman Catholic bishops